Lamzawl is a village in the Champhai district of Mizoram, India. It is located in the Ngopa R.D. Block. The Lengteng Wildlife Sanctuary is located adjacent to the village.

Demographics 

According to the 2011 census of India, Lamzawl has 72 households. The effective literacy rate (i.e. the literacy rate of population excluding children aged 6 and below) is 95.89%.

References 

Villages in Ngopa block